is the 7th-most-common Japanese surname. Notable people with the surname include:

Sports 

, Japanese tennis player
, Japanese decathlete
, Japanese ice hockey player
, Japanese figure skater
, Japanese volleyball player
, Japanese rugby sevens player
, Japanese field hockey player
, Japanese ice hockey player
, Japanese swimmer
Kazuhiro Nakamura (ski jumper) (born 1980), Japanese ski jumper
, Japanese volleyball player
, Japanese basketball coach
, Japanese sailor
, Japanese figure skater
, Japanese table tennis player
Kisato Nakamura (born 1993), Japanese cyclist
, Japanese middle-distance runner
, Japanese basketball player
, Japanese swimmer
, Japanese synchronized swimmer
, Japanese rugby union player and coach
, Japanese speed skater
, Japanese swimmer
, Japanese rugby union player
, Japanese speed skater
, Japanese figure skater
Tadao Nakamura (born 1947), Japanese golfer
, Japanese biathlete
, Japanese gymnast
Teruo Nakamura (golfer) (born 1952), Japanese golfer
Tomohiko Nakamura (born 1991), Japanese vert skater
, Japanese golfer
, Japanese golfer
, Japanese bobsledder
, Japanese baseball player
, Japanese long-distance runner
, Japanese long-distance runner
, Japanese volleyball player

Martial arts and wrestling 

, Japanese mixed martial artist
, Japanese mixed martial artist
, Japanese mixed martial artist and judoka
, Japanese mixed martial artist
, Japanese judoka
, Japanese judoka
, better known as Bad Nurse Nakamura, Japanese professional wrestler
Seigi Nakamura (1924–1999), Okinawan karateka
Shigeru Nakamura (karate instructor) (born 1894), Japanese karate instructor
, Japanese professional wrestler and mixed martial artist
, Japanese karateka
Nakamura Taizaburo, founder of Nakamura-ryū
, Japanese martial artist and founder of Japanese yoga
, Japanese boxer
, Japanese judoka
, Japanese judoka

Baseball 

, Japanese baseball player
, Japanese baseball player
, Japanese baseball player
, Japanese baseball player
, Japanese baseball player
Micheal Nakamura (born 1976), Japanese-Australian baseball player
, Japanese baseball player
, Japanese baseball player
, Japanese baseball player
, Japanese baseball player

Board games 

, Japanese Go player
Hikaru Nakamura (born 1987), American chess player
, Japanese shogi player
, Japanese shogi player
, Japanese Renju player
, Japanese Go player
, Japanese Magic: The Gathering player
, Japanese Go player
, Japanese shogi player
, Japanese shogi player

Football 

, Japanese footballer
, Japanese footballer
, Japanese footballer
, Japanese footballer
Haruki Nakamura (born 1986), American football player
, Japanese footballer
, Japanese footballer
, Japanese footballer
, Japanese footballer
, Japanese women's footballer
, Japanese footballer
, Japanese footballer
, Japanese footballer
, Japanese footballer
, Japanese footballer
, Japanese footballer
, Japanese footballer
, Japanese footballer
, Japanese footballer
, Japanese footballer
, Japanese footballer
, Japanese footballer
, Japanese footballer and manager
, Japanese footballer
, Japanese footballer
, Japanese footballer
, Japanese footballer
, Japanese footballer and manager
, Japanese footballer
, Japanese footballer
, Japanese footballer
, Japanese footballer
, Japanese footballer
, Japanese footballer
, Japanese footballer
, Japanese footballer
, Japanese footballer
, Japanese footballer

Academia 

, Japanese astronomer
, Japanese academic
Alice Nakamura, Canadian economist
, Japanese chemist
Emi Nakamura, American economist
, Japanese academic
, Japanese biochemist
Karen Nakamura (born 1970), American academic and writer
, Japanese scholar of Islam
Lisa Nakamura, American academic
, Japanese scientist
, Japanese-born American engineer, inventor, academic and 2014 Nobel Prize in Physics
, Japanese economist
, Japanese physician
, Japanese quantum physicist
, Japanese geneticist and cancer researcher

Arts 

, Japanese model, television personality and actress
Carol Nakamura (born 1983), Brazilian dancer, actress and television personality
, Japanese writer
, Japanese writer
, Japanese anime screenwriter
, Japanese writer
, Japanese writer
Tadashi Nakamura (filmmaker) (born c. 1980), Japanese-American filmmaker

Music 

, Japanese singer-songwriter and actress
Aya Nakamura (born 1995), French singer
Dan Nakamura, American music producer
Goh Nakamura, American musician, film score composer and actor
, Japanese songwriter and jazz pianist
 , Japanese singer, ballet dancer, rapper and member of K-pop girl group Le Sserafim
, Japanese video game composer
, Japanese musician, and former guitarist and lead singer for the Japanese rock band Supercar
, Japanese video game composer
, Japanese singer
, Japanese musician
, Japanese singer-songwriter who performs under the name Naoto Inti Raymi
, Japanese composer and music teacher
, Japanese musician
, Japanese jazz bassist
Toshimaru Nakamura, Japanese musician
, Japanese singer, model, television personality and gravure idol
, Japanese composer and pianist
, Japanese classical pianist
, Japanese video game composer

Acting 

, Japanese actor
, Japanese actor and politician
, Japanese actress
, Japanese voice actress
, Japanese actress and gravure model
, Japanese voice actor
, Japanese voice actor and actor
, Japanese actress and voice actress
, Japanese actor
, Japanese voice actor
, Japanese actor and model
Nakamura Kankurō VI (born 1981), Japanese kabuki actor
Nakamura Kanzaburō, Kabuki stage name
Nakamura Kanzaburō XVIII (1955–2012), Japanese kabuki actor
, Japanese actor
, Japanese actress
, Japanese actor and singer
, Japanese actor
, Japanese actor
Saemi Nakamura, American actress
Nakamura Shichinosuke II (born 1983), Japanese kabuki actor
, Japanese gravure idol and actress
, Japanese voice actor and singer
, Japanese voice actor
Suzy Nakamura, American actress
, Japanese voice actor
, Japanese actress
, Japanese actor and opera singer
, Japanese actor
, Japanese actor
, Japanese kabuki actor
Nakamura Utaemon I (1714–1791), Japanese actor
Nakamura Utaemon II (1752–1798), Japanese actor
Nakamura Utaemon III (1778–1838), Japanese actor
Nakamura Utaemon IV (1798–1852), Japanese actor
Nakamura Utaemon V (1865–1940), Japanese actor
Nakamura Utaemon VI (1917–2001), Japanese actor
, Japanese actor and singer, member of Japanese talent group D-BOYS
, Japanese voice actor
, Japanese actress
, Japanese actress and singer
, Japanese actress

Visual arts 

, Japanese manga artist
Félix Nakamura (1940–2000), Peruvian animator
, Japanese painter
, Japanese painter
, Japanese photographer
, Japanese manga artist
, Japanese artist
, Japanese photographer
Kazuo Nakamura (1926–2002), Japanese-Canadian painter and sculptor
, Japanese anime director
, Japanese photographer
, Japanese artist and poet
, Japanese painter
, Japanese painter and sculptor
, Japanese film director
, Japanese photographer
Robert A. Nakamura (born 1937), American documentary filmmaker
, Japanese anime director
, Japanese manga artist
, Japanese animator and anime director
, Japanese yōga painter
, Japanese film director and screenwriter
, Japanese manga artist
, Japanese animator

Politics and military 

, Japanese politician
, Japanese politician
, Japanese politician
Judith Nakamura (born 1960), American judge
, Japanese politician
, Japanese general
, Japanese general
, former President of Palau
, Imperial Japanese Army general
, Japanese politician
, Japanese businessman and politician
, Japanese politician
, Japanese politician
, Japanese bureaucrat, entrepreneur and politician
, Japanese general
Itaru Nakamura (born 1963), Japanese police bureaucrat

Other 

Craig H. Nakamura (born 1956), American jurist
Eric Nakamura, American magazine publisher
, Japanese dissident and convicted murderer
Ichiro Nakamura (died 1999), Japanese religious leader
Nakamura Ichiroemon, 17th-century Japanese swordsman
, Japanese video game artist
, Japanese geisha
, Japanese video game designer
, Japanese celebrity chef
, Japanese businessman
, Japanese samurai, philosopher and educator
, Japanese businessman
, Japanese announcer
, Japanese educator and Scouting leader
, Japanese serial killer
, Japanese car designer
, Japanese video game designer
, Japanese soldier and World War II holdout
William K. Nakamura (1922–1944), United States Army soldier and Medal of Honor recipient
, Japanese shoot wrestler
, Japanese web designer

Fictional characters
Aika Nakamura, a character in the video game Persona 4
Asako Nakamura, a character in the manga series Ushio and Tora
Ethan Nakamura, a character in the novel series Percy Jackson and The Olympians
Hajime Nakamura, a character in the tokusatsu series Kamen Rider Ryuki
Hiro Nakamura, a character in the American television series Heroes
Jay Nakamura, Superman (Jon Kent)'s boyfriend in DC Comics
Kaito Nakamura, a character in the American television series Heroes
Kimiko Nakamura, a character in the American television series Heroes
, a character in the manga series Assassination Classroom
Okuto Nakamura, a character in the manga series Go For It, Nakamura! 
Yuri Nakamura, a character in the anime series Angel Beats!
Vice Admiral Nakamura, a character in the television series Star Trek: The Next Generation
Nakamura, a character in the manga series Kodomo no Jikan
Sawa Nakamura, a character in the manga "Aku no hana"
Suzy Nakamura, a character in the graphic novel American Born Chinese
Shiori Nakamura, a character in the video game Yo-kai Watch

References

See also
Japanese name
List of most popular Japanese family names

Japanese-language surnames

fr:Nakamura
ja:中村
pt:Nakamura
fi:Nakamura
zh:中村